Eulimnadia is a genus of branchiopods in the family Limnadiidae. There are about 13 described species in Eulimnadia.

Species
 Eulimnadia agassizii Packard, 1874
 Eulimnadia antillarum (Baird, 1852)
 Eulimnadia antlei Mackin, 1940
 Eulimnadia astraova Belk, 1989
 Eulimnadia cylindrova Belk, 1989
 Eulimnadia diversa Mattox, 1937
 Eulimnadia francescae 
 Eulimnadia inflecta 
 Eulimnadia oryzae 
 Eulimnadia stoningtonensis 
 Eulimnadia texana (Packard, 1871)
 Eulimnadia thompsoni 
 Eulimnadia ventricosa

References

Further reading

 

Diplostraca
Branchiopoda genera